The Bryan Sports were an East Texas League minor league baseball team based in Bryan, Texas that played during the 1950 season. The squad was managed by Bones Sanders and went 23–65 before disbanding on July 20. 

The Sports played their home games at Travis Field.

References

Baseball teams established in 1950
Defunct minor league baseball teams
1950 establishments in Texas
1950 disestablishments in Texas
Baseball teams disestablished in 1950
Defunct baseball teams in Texas
Bryan, Texas
East Texas League teams